Angeli Bayani (born November 13, 1977) is a Filipino actress. She is best known for starring in Philippine art-house and independent films notably those by Lav Diaz's  Melancholia (2008), Century of Birthing (2011), and Norte, the End of History (2013) for which she won the 2014 Gawad Urian Award for Best Actress. She also appeared in the Camera d'Or-winning Singaporean film Ilo Ilo (2013) by Anthony Chen.

Filmography

Television

Movies

References

External links

20th-century Filipino actresses
Filipino film actresses
Living people
Place of birth missing (living people)
1977 births